"Summer Is Crazy" is a song by Italian singer Alexia, released as the second single from her debut album, Fan Club (1997). Co-written by Alexia, it was very successful, reaching number one on the Italian singles chart and becoming a top 5 hit in both Finland and Spain. This was the first of two singles to feature radio jingles of the track on the CD. The song would also be featured as a B-side on the UK editions of "Gimme Love" in 1998, although due to a misprint, writing credits went only to Alexia. In February 2013, the singer announced that a new version of "Summer Is Crazy" would feature on her upcoming album, "ICanzonissime".

Release
The song was initially released in Italy on CD and 12" (coded DWA 96.01), with releases in other European countries following. As with "Me and You", the German edition would be released by ZYX, the Spanish release by Blanco Y Negro and the French release by Panic (a subsidiary of Polygram. A remix release later came out, although this time on both CD and 12". This would be the first of Alexia's singles to be released in certain territories by Sony Music through their subsidiary Dancepool. Two European CD were released- the standard CD and remix CD (Sony code 663521) in addition to an Australia CD release (Sony code 663486). Alexia's relationship with Sony would continue until 2005.

Lyrics
The lyrics of the song describes a broken relationship, sung from the perspective of the woman/singer. It tells about how the summer reminds her of their love and the refrain goes like "the summer is crazy, tonight. La la la la." This is further fleshed out with the accompanying music video, showing several individuals in a sad, crazy and/or lonely setting and mood. Eventually it turns out that the woman is ready to move on, cause she knows that "I will never have your love".

Critical reception
AllMusic editor Tom Demalon described the song as a "thumping number replete with tinkling keyboard flourishes" in his review of Fan Club.

Chart performance
"Summer Is Crazy" was a major hit in several countries in Europe, and remains one of Alexia's most successful songs to date. It peaked at number-one in Italy, with a total of 17 weeks inside the chart, and also peaked at number two in Spain and number three in Finland. Additionally, the single made it to the top 30 in both Belgium and Switzerland, and the top 40 in Austria and France, as well as on the Eurochart Hot 100, where it reached its highest position as number 35 in July 1996. "Summer Is Crazy" did not chart on the UK Singles Chart in the UK.

Music video
A music video was produced to promote the single. The video version was edited up to the end of the middle.

Track listing

 12" single, Spain (1996)
 "Summer Is Crazy" (Classic Euro Mix) – 6:50
 "Summer Is Crazy" (Radio Mix) – 4:20
 "Summer Is Crazy" (Nightfly Mix) – 7:22
 "Summer Is Crazy" (Blue Mix) – 7:56

 12" maxi single, Italy (1996)
 "Summer Is Crazy" (Nightfly Mix) – 7:22
 "Summer Is Crazy" (Radio Mix) – 4:20
 "Summer Is Crazy" (Blue Mix) – 7:56
 "Summer Is Crazy" (Classic Euro Mix) – 6:50

 CD single, France (1996)
 "Summer Is Crazy" (Radio Mix) – 4:20
 "Summer Is Crazy" (Classic Euro Mix) – 6:50

 CD single, Germany (1996)
 "Summer Is Crazy" (Radio Mix) – 4:20
 "Summer Is Crazy" (Dado World Mix Radio) – 3:58

 CD maxi, Europe (1996)
 "Summer Is Crazy" (Radio Mix) – 4:20
 "Summer Is Crazy" (Night Fly Mix) – 7:22
 "Summer Is Crazy" (Blue Mix) – 7:56
 "Summer Is Crazy" (Classic Euro Mix) – 6:50
 "Summer Is Crazy" (Radio Jingle 1) – 0:14
 "Summer Is Crazy" (Radio Jingle 2) – 0:14
 "Summer Is Crazy" (Radio Jingle 3) – 0:10

Charts

Weekly charts

Year-end charts

References

1996 singles
1996 songs
Alexia (Italian singer) songs
Electronic songs
Eurodance songs
Songs written by Roberto Zanetti
Songs written by Alexia (Italian singer)
Number-one singles in Italy
Dance Pool singles